National Highway 334 (NH 334) is a  National Highway in India.

References

National highways in India
Transport in Haridwar